Natasha Dervill O'Keeffe (born 1 December 1986) is a British actress. She is known for her roles as Abbey in the E4 series Misfits (2012–2013), Fedora in the ITV series Jekyll and Hyde (2015), Emilia Ricoletti in the Sherlock special "The Abominable Bride" (2016), and Lizzie Shelby in the BBC series Peaky Blinders (2013–2022).

Early life
Born in Brighton to Irish parents from County Cavan, she was raised in Tooting, South London. O'Keeffe trained at the Royal Welsh College of Music and Drama, and starred in a number of their stage productions.

Career
O'Keeffe first came to public attention in 2008, playing a member of the Royal Family who enjoys parties, one night stands and drugs in the music video for "Falling Down", the last single released by Oasis before the band dissolved. That same year, she had a part in the feature film Abraham's Point.

In 2010 and 2012, O'Keeffe played Sadie in both seasons of BBC Three's drama series Lip Service, about a group of lesbians living in Glasgow, Scotland. In 2012 and 2013 she played Abbey Smith in the lead ensemble for the final two seasons of E4's comedy-drama Misfits, about a group of young offenders in a London community service program who obtain supernatural powers.

In 2013, she had a role in an episode of Law & Order: UK, and appeared in the feature films Filth and Svengali.

In 2015, she starred as Fedora, the side-kick and lover of the main antagonist in ITV's TV series, Jekyll and Hyde. She also starred in a music video for Daughter's song "Numbers" as part of a series of films for the band's album Not to Disappear.

In 2016, she appeared in the Sherlock special "The Abominable Bride" as the titular bride, Emelia Ricoletti.

From 2013 to 2022, O'Keeffe portrayed the character Lizzie Shelby in Peaky Blinders.

Filmography

References

External links

Natasha O'Keeffe at United Agents Literary and Talent Agency

1986 births
Living people
People from Brighton
British people of Irish descent
Alumni of the Royal Welsh College of Music & Drama
English stage actresses
English television actresses
People from Tooting